La Broquerie is a rural municipality in the province of Manitoba in Western Canada, located in the southeastern part of the province, just south and east of the city of Steinbach.

The municipality consists of 6 townships.
La Broquerie is a fast-growing community consisting of a wide range of cultural backgrounds including English, French and Mennonite. The 2011 Census reported a population of 5,198 persons, a 42.1% increase from the 3,659 reported in 2006.

The unincorporated community of La Broquerie to the north, and the general development zones of Marchand to the east and Zhoda to the south form the urban centres of the municipality. Besides the urban areas, the municipality mainly consists of agricultural production and rural residential developments in the northern half to hog production facilities and vastly undeveloped areas in the south.

History 
La Broquerie's history is well documented through the La Broquerie Historical Trail; a series of 15 interpretive signs that share the history of the community.  QR codes lead the visitor to exclusive anecdotes shared by local ambassadors. Download the promotional pamphlet of the La Broquerie Historical Trail here. 

There is also a Parish centennial that was produced to commemorate the St-Joachim Catholic Parish's centennial, celebrated in 1984.

Geography
According to Statistics Canada, the rural municipality has an area of 578.20 km² (223.24 sq mi). There are no separately incorporated cities, towns or villages within the municipality. Provincial Highways #12 and #52 run through the southwest and north portions of the municipality respectively. Provincial Roads #301 and #302, both gravel highways, bisect the municipality.
The municipality is located in the plant hardiness zone of 3a/3b. 
The municipality straddles the aspen parkland, the traditional tallgrass prairie and the Manitoba lowlands regions.

Communities
 La Broquerie
 Marchand
 Zhoda

Demographics 

References

External links
 Official website
 Tourism MAP of La Broquerie
 Tourism MAP of Marchand
 Map of La Broquerie R.M. at Statcan

Rural municipalities in Manitoba